The 2020 Macau Guia Race was the fifth edition of the Macau Guia Race under the TCR Regulations held at Guia Circuit in Macau on 19–22 November 2020. The race was contested with TCR touring cars and run in support of the 2020 edition of the Macau Grand Prix. The race also served as the final round of the 2020 TCR China Touring Car Championship.

Due to the impact of the COVID-19 pandemic, this race was not held as planned, as part of the 2020 World Touring Car Cup, instead only serving as part of the local China championship.

Teams and drivers
The following teams and drivers are entered into the event:

Results

Qualifying

Qualification Race

 Bold denotes fastest lap. 
 Only TCR China-entered cars are eligible for points.
  Wong Kiang Kuan finished eleventh but was given a 30-second time penalty.

Main Race

 Bold denotes fastest lap. 
 Only TCR China-entered cars are eligible for points.
  Robert Huff finished 1st but was given a 30-second penalty for contact with Ma Qing Hua.
  Andy Yan finished 3rd but was given a 30-second penalty for overtaking Sunny Wong under yellow flag conditions.
  Sun Jun Long finished 15th but was given a 30-second penalty.

References

External links 

 TCR China Series Official website
 Macau Grand Prix Official website

Macau Guia Race
Macau Guia Race
Macau Guia Race